Rena Bitter is an American diplomat who served as the United States Ambassador to Laos from 2016 to 2020 and is currently serving as Assistant Secretary of State for Consular Affairs.

Early life and education
Bitter grew up in Dallas, Texas, one of three children of Frieda and Herb Bitter. She received her Bachelor of Science degree from Northwestern University in 1986 as well as a Juris Doctor from the Dedman School of Law at Southern Methodist University in 1991.

Career
Bitter began her career in the U.S. Foreign Service in 1994. She served on the Department of State's Executive Secretariat Staff from 2000 to 2001, and served as a Special Assistant in the Office of the Secretary of State from 2001 to 2002. After that she served in London from 2002 to 2003 as a Transatlantic Diplomatic Fellow, and then as Chief of the Nonimmigrant Visa Unit in the Consular Section there. In her next assignment, Bitter was Consular Section Chief at the U.S. Embassy in Amman, Jordan from 2006 to 2009. She then returned to domestic assignments at the Department of State's Operations Center from 2009 to 2012. As a result of her role in operations, Bitter was called as a witness in the court-martial of Bradley Manning (later Chelsea Manning), a United States Army soldier who was subsequently convicted in July 2013 of violations of the Espionage Act and other offenses, after disclosing to WikiLeaks nearly 750,000 classified, or unclassified but sensitive, military and diplomatic documents.

From 2012 until she became Ambassador to Laos, Bitter served as Consul General at the U.S. Consulate General in Ho Chi Minh City, Vietnam. She presented her credentials on November 1, 2016. Her mission terminated on January 26, 2020.

On April 21, 2021, President Joe Biden announced Bitter as the nominee to be the Assistant Secretary of State for Consular Affairs. Her nomination was sent to the Senate on April 28, 2021, and confirmed by voice vote on August 9, 2021.

Personal
Bitter speaks Spanish, Arabic and Vietnamese.

References

Living people
Ambassadors of the United States to Laos
American women ambassadors
Obama administration personnel
Trump administration personnel
Biden administration personnel
Northwestern University alumni
Southern Methodist University alumni
United States Foreign Service personnel
United States Assistant Secretaries of State
Year of birth missing (living people)
21st-century American women
People from Dallas
Dedman School of Law alumni
American diplomats
American women diplomats